Shobha Gosa is a Women's activist and leadership developer, espousing the movement among youth towards women empowerment through sustained education.  She is also a person with interfaith understanding, who has also contributed papers.

Education and Career
After her Undergraduate education from Anantapur from the portals of Sri Krishnadevaraya University, Shobha began her career with Non-governmental organisations in India in the New millennium, notably, the Henry Martyn Institute, Shivarampally.  In 2012, she founded Young People for Life India as a registered Trust to achieve her vision of women empowerment.

Recognition
Shobha's espousal of causes ranging from youth leadership, talent management, communication skills and behavioral management, as well as gender empowerment and peace building have been recognised over the past many years.  In 2011, on the sidelines of United Nations International Women's Day Centenary Celebrations held by United Nations, Government of Andhra Pradesh and State Institute of Rural Development in Hyderabad, she was awarded a Young Women Achiever Award along with three other women.  In 2014, Shobha was a recipient of Sadguru Gnananda Fellowship awarded by a Chennai-based institution, Manava Seva Dharma Samvardhani.  The citation read,

References

Further reading
 
 
 
 

Activists from Telangana
Telugu people
People from Telangana
People from Andhra Pradesh
Living people
Year of birth missing (living people)
Indian women activists
Indian women's rights activists
20th-century Indian women
20th-century Indian people
Alumni of Oxford Brookes University